Kong Xue (born August 26, 1991) is a Chinese short track speed skater. She won a gold medal in the 3000 m relay event in 2012.

References

1991 births
Living people
Chinese female speed skaters
Chinese female short track speed skaters
Universiade medalists in short track speed skating
Universiade gold medalists for China
Universiade silver medalists for China
Competitors at the 2011 Winter Universiade
20th-century Chinese women
21st-century Chinese women